Dasari Girija ( 3 March 1938 – 5 September 1995) was an Indian actress who has worked in Telugu films. She was active in the 1950s, 1960s and 1970s in comic roles. She appeared in many films with Relangi, the two of them becoming a famous comedic duo.

Film career
She was born on 3 March 1938 in Kankipadu, Andhra Pradesh. Her mother is also staging and film actress Dasari Ramatilakam.

Her first movie was Kasturi Sivarao's Paramanandayya Sishyulu (1950). She acted in many films with Relangi and other leading actors of that period. Her portrayal of titular Pathala Bhairavi in 1951 hit film Patala Bhairavi displayed her talents and resulted in her getting many film offers lasting about two decades. Her role as Usha in Appu Chesi Pappu Koodu (1959) opposite Relangi is memorable. The ever lasting comedy song Kaseeki Poyanu Ramahari has been pictured on them. The comedy-duo also acted in the award-winning Ramudu Bheemudu (1964) of Suresh Productions. The funny Sarada Sarada Cigarettu song about the habit of Smoking is superhit during that time. She also acted in Tamil films during the fifties.

She along with Relangi acted in small but key roles in the epic film Lava Kusa (1963) by Shankar Reddy and refused to take any extra remuneration for the extratime in shooting the song Ollanori mama nee pillanee…. In addition to the comedy roles, she played as character actress in the key role of Hemalatha opposite Akkineni Nageswara Rao acting as second heroine in Bharya Bhartalu (1961) and as Varalaxmi in Velugu Needalu (1961). She has played key roles in some mythological and Janapada films, like Dharma Devatha (1952).

She started a film company with her husband C. S. Raju as a producer, named Vijaya Giri Dhwaja Productions (named after Girija) and produced few movies including Bhale Mastaru (1969) and Pavitra Hrudayalu (1971), in both films main protagonist is played by N. T. Rama Rao. They met with a heavy financial loss.

Personal life
She married C. Sanyasi Raju, popularly known as C. S. Raju; their daughter Saleema is also an actress who acts mainly in Malayalam movies. According to her daughter Saleema, Girija died on 5 September 1995. Though she has been suffering from Diabetes, in the last moments she experienced some breathing problem and died suddenly in her Chennai residence.

Filmography

References

External links
 

1938 births
1995 deaths
Telugu actresses
Telugu comedians
Indian film actresses
Indian women comedians
Actresses in Telugu cinema
20th-century Indian actresses
People from Krishna district
Actresses from Andhra Pradesh
Actresses in Malayalam cinema
Actresses in Tamil cinema